Pre Teenage Jesus and the Jerks is a single by Teenage Jesus and the Jerks, released in November 1979 by ZE Records.

The release presents 1977 recordings, a prehistory of the band. Teenage Jesus and the Jerks (Lydia Lunch with Gordon Stevenson and Bradley Field) would rerecord "The Closet" for the 1978 No New York compilation.

Track listing

Personnel
Adapted from the Pre Teenage Jesus and the Jerks liner notes.

Teenage Jesus and the Jerks
 Kawashima Akiyoshi (Reck) – bass guitar
 James Chance – alto saxophone, mixing
 Bradley Field – drums, percussion
 Lydia Lunch – vocals, electric guitar, mixing

Production and additional personnel
 Julia Gorton – cover art

Release history

References

External links 
 

1979 EPs
Teenage Jesus and the Jerks albums
Celluloid Records EPs
ZE Records EPs